Mīr Lutfullāh Khān Bahādur Shirāzī, was a Mughal official who held a number of positions during his life such as the Faujdar of Shujabad Sarkar from 1656 to 1658 and the faujdar of Sylhet Sarkar up until 1663.

Background and origin 

Shirazi was of Persian descent, originally from the Iranian city of Shiraz.

Career 

Documents show that Shirazi was a commander for the Subahdar of Bengal, Shah Shuja. He succeeded Noorullah Khan Herati as Faujdar of Shujabad Sarkar (Kamrup region) in 1656. In 1657, Shirazi built the hilltop mosque at Hajo, known as Powa-Makkah Barmaqam. It contained the shrine of Ghiyath ad-Din Awliya, an Iraqi prince and preacher commonly credited for introducing Islam to the region.  Shirazi was a disciple of Shah Syed Niamatullah of Karnal and he was visited by the Shah in this mosque according to inscriptions.

As Mir Jumla's invasion of Assam commenced, Shirazi fled from Guwahati to Dhaka in 1658 after the Ahoms and the Koch Biharis rebelled, being led by their rulers Supangmung and Pran Narayan respectively. In Dhaka, he was then appointed the faujdar of Sylhet Sarkar and migrated there, replacing Sultan Nazar. In 1660, he established a strong enclosure in Shah Jalal's dargah in Sylhet town and also built a small mosque next to it. The Persian inscription stating this is still in existence today.

He granted Pandit Raghunath Bisharad of Shamshernagar three and a half haals of land in Ita Pargana in 1663.

Legacy 
Sunarphool was a member of Shirazi's family . During the reign of King Paikhomba (r.1666–1697) of nearby Manipur, a Muslim nobleman called Muhammad Sani presented gold and elephants to the King in return that he allows more Muslims to reside in his kingdom. The king accepted, and Sunarphool moved to Manipur on Muhammad Sani's request where he lived for the rest of his life. The Pangals that belong to the Makak Angouba clan are descendants of Lutfullah Shirazi through Sunarphool.

See also 
 History of Sylhet

References 

|-

Rulers of Sylhet
Indian people of Iranian descent
People from Shiraz
Mughal princes
17th-century rulers in Asia
17th-century Indian Muslims
17th-century Iranian politicians